KULH is a radio station airing a format consisting of Christian contemporary music and Christian talk and teaching, licensed to Wheeling, Missouri, broadcasting on 105.9 MHz FM.  The station serves the areas of Brookfield, Missouri and Chillicothe, Missouri, and is owned by Resources Management Unlimited, Inc.

References

External links

ULH